John Buckley (1863 - 10 September 1935) was an Irish hurler who played for Cork Championship club Aghabullogue. He played for the Cork senior hurling team for one season, during which time he usually lined out as a goalkeeper.

Playing career

Aghabullogue

Buckley joined the Aghabullogue club when it was founded and quickly became the club's goalkeeper. On 13 July 1890, Buckley was in goal when Aghabullogue defeated Aghada by 7-03 to 1-01 to win the Cork Championship.

Cork

Buckley made his first appearance for the Cork hurling team on 29 September 1890. He lined out in goal as Cork defeated Kerry by 2-00 to 0-01 to win the Munster Championship. Buckley was again in goal on 16 November when Cork defeated Wexford by 1-06 to 2-02 in the All-Ireland final.

Career statistics

Honours

Aghabullogue
Cork Senior Hurling Championship (1): 1890

Cork
All-Ireland Senior Hurling Championship (1): 1890
Munster Senior Hurling Championship (1): 1890

References

External links

 John Buckley obituary

1863 births
1935 deaths
Aghabullogue hurlers
Cork inter-county hurlers
All-Ireland Senior Hurling Championship winners
Hurling goalkeepers